Todzhinsky District (Toju kojuun) is an administrative and municipal district (raion, or kozhuun), one of the seventeen in the Tuva Republic, Russia. It is located in the northeast of the republic. Its administrative center is the rural locality (a selo) of Toora-Khem. Population:  5,931 (2002 Census);  The population of Toora-Khem accounts for 39.7% of the district's total population.

Geography and economy
The district is located in the isolated part of the republic, far from its developed regions. As a result, its location impedes the economic development of the territory and infrastructure. Ship transport is the main means of communication with the rest of the republic in summer.
The district border Piy-Khemsky and Kyzylsky District to the southwest, Kaa-Khemsky District to south and southeast, Kuraginsky and Karatuzsky District of Krasnoyarsk Krai to the northwest and west, Nizhneudinsky District of Irkutsk Oblast to the northeast, Okinsky District of Republic of Buryatia in the east.

See also
Tozhu Tuvans

References

Notes

Sources



Districts of Tuva

pl:Kożuun barun-chiemczycki